Aspergillus floccosus is a species of fungus in the genus Aspergillus. It is from the Terrei section. The species was first described in 2011. It has been reported to produce aszonalenin, butyrolactones, citrinin, a decaturin, dihydrocitrinone, an isocoumarin, and serantrypinone.

Growth and morphology

A. floccosus has been cultivated on both Czapek yeast extract agar (CYA) plates and Malt Extract Agar Oxoid® (MEAOX) plates. The growth morphology of the colonies can be seen in the pictures below.

References 

floccosus
Fungi described in 2011